"Closer than Close" is a 1986 R&B ballad by former Norman Connors vocalist, Jean Carne. The single was a number-one hit on the U.S. R&B chart for two weeks. "Closer than Close" was written by Terry Price and Brandi Wells and produced by Grover Washington Jr.

References

1986 singles
1986 songs
Jean Carn songs
Contemporary R&B ballads